Germasogeia is an eastern suburb of Limassol and a municipality in the Limassol District of Cyprus. , Germasogeia had a population of 13,421. Its current mayor is Kyriakos Xidias. He won the local elections on 18 December 2016 as an independent candidate. During the elections, Xidias prevailed with 26.73% of the vote against 23.01% of two-term incumbent Andreas Gavrielides.

The small town was fortified in the medieval period by the Knights Templar. Germasogeia dam was built there in 1968.

International relations

Twin towns — sister cities
Germasogeia is twinned with:

  Stari Grad, Serbia
This twin town is associated with Germasogeia.

References 

Municipalities in Limassol District